Devraha Baba (died 19 June 1990), was an Indian Siddha Yogi saint who lived beside the Yamuna river in Mathura. He was known as "ageless Yogi".

Life
Little is known about the early life of Devraha Baba, beyond that in the first half of the 20th century he visited Maiel, a town 20 km south west of Salempur, Uttar Pradesh. Here he started living atop a machan, a high platform made of wooden logs, situated 3 km from the town on the banks of Sarayu river. The place was near chilma Bazar Deoria District, thus local people started calling him Devraha Baba, with Baba being an honorific for saints or old men. Thereafter he shifted to Vrindavan, where again he lived atop a machan on the banks of Yamuna river for the rest of his years. He visited many places in India and known in different names in different states. At Purneswari Maa Tara Tarini shakti Peetha 
in Ganjam (Odisha), locals addressed him by the name of Chamatkari Baba. Even today, the priests of Maa Tara Tarini Shakti Peetha remember his miracles during his visit to Maa's Peetha. Once Devraha Baba also attested to it in an Interview with All India Radio. 

Devraha Baba was a hermit from Vrindavan.  He was considered to be a "spiritual guide to everyone from a pauper to the most powerful ... above narrow confines of caste and community." Village people as well as important personalities waited for hours to have a glimpse or darshan of him. He received visits from politicians seeking his blessings at the time of general elections, including Indira Gandhi, Buta Singh, and Rajiv Gandhi. Rajiv Gandhi and his wife Sonia Gandhi visited his ashram on the eve of the 1989 elections. He used to bless the devotees with his feet.

He lived on a  wooden platform near the river and wore a small deerskin. A barricade of wooden planks hid his semi-naked body from his devotees, and he came down only to bathe in the river.

Notes

References

 - Total pages: 367 
 - Total pages: 434 
 - Total pages: 490 

1990 deaths
Longevity myths
People from Mathura
Deoria district
Indian Hindu yogis
20th-century Hindu religious leaders